Gabriel Blike ( 1520 –  1592) was an English politician who was a Member of Parliament (MP) for the constituency of Cirencester for the parliament of 1571.

References 

English MPs 1571
Members of Parliament for Cirencester
1520s births
1590s deaths
Year of birth uncertain
Year of death uncertain
English justices of the peace